The 2008 Tums QuikPak 500 was the thirty-second stock car race of the 2008 NASCAR Sprint Cup season and started off the second half of the 2008 Chase for the Sprint Cup. The 500-lap,  event, the only race on the Chase that was held on a short track, was held on October 19 at Martinsville Speedway in Martinsville, Virginia. ABC carried the race beginning at 1 pm US EDT and MRN along with Sirius Satellite Radio had radio coverage starting at 12:45 pm US EDT.

Rockingham testing 
A new 0.526-mile clone of Martinsville at Rockingham Speedway was finished the Monday before the race, and was broken-in by owner Andy Hillenburg's driving school.

As Rockingham is not on any of NASCAR's national series, unrestricted testing was permissible at the track, and six teams tested at Rockingham in preparation for the race—Sprint Cup teams Furniture Row Racing, Joe Gibbs Racing, and Haas CNC Racing, in addition to the Craftsman Truck team of Wyler Racing tested Tuesday.  Hendrick Motorsports, Petty Enterprises, and Gillett Evernham Motorsports (which tested both AJ Allemendinger, who drives the #10 for the remainder of 2008, and test driver Dennis Setzer) tested Wednesday.  Thursday, Colin Braun tested a Sprint Cup car in the afternoon after testing on the traditional  speedway in the morning.

Jimmie Johnson, who tested for Hendrick, noted Rockingham's half-mile was similar to Martinsville, and credited the Wednesday test for helping him during Saturday practice and eventually Sunday's race at Martinsville.

With NASCAR's 2009 testing ban in effect, Rockingham's half-mile is expected to pick up testing, especially in the week before the Sprint Cup returns to Martinsville.

Qualifying
For the second week in a row and the ninth time this season, rain cancelled qualifying, and the field will be set via rulebook.

Race recap
Jimmie Johnson and Jeff Gordon were the main two factors early in the race until Gordon's car started falling back where Dale Earnhardt Jr. was the only one giving Johnson a run for his money. Jimmie Johnson went on to win the race and Earnhardt finished second. Earnhardt criticized NASCAR for finding a way to bring out the yellow flag.

NOTE: Race extended four laps due to green-white-checker finish rule.
Failed to make race as qualifying was cancelled due to rain: Sterling Marlin (#09), Derrike Cope (#75).

Following the race in an inspection at NASCAR's Research and Development Center, it was discovered that the Team Red Bull #83 Toyota driven by Brian Vickers had illegal sheet metal thinner than that required under NASCAR's rules. As a result, the team's crew chief, Kevin Hamlin and car chief Kevin Smokstad were suspended indefinitely, Hamlin fined $100,000 and the team and Vickers were penalized 150 owners and drivers points respectively.

Tums QuikPak 500
Tums QuikPak 500
NASCAR races at Martinsville Speedway
October 2008 sports events in the United States